Karl-Friedrich Haas (28 July 1931 – 12 August 2021) was a West German athlete who mainly competed in the 400 metres. He was born in Berlin, Brandenburg, Prussia, Germany. He competed for West Germany in the 1952 Summer Olympics held in Helsinki, Finland where he won the bronze medal in the 4 x 400 metre relay with his team mates Hans Geister, Günther Steines and Heinz Ulzheimer. Four years later he competed for the United Team of Germany in the 1956 Summer Olympics held in Melbourne, Australia and won a silver in the individual 400 metres. His son Christian Haas was also an Olympic competitor.

References

External links
 
 

1931 births
2021 deaths
German male sprinters
Olympic athletes of West Germany
Olympic athletes of the United Team of Germany
Olympic silver medalists in athletics (track and field)
Olympic bronze medalists for West Germany
Olympic silver medalists for the United Team of Germany
Olympic bronze medalists in athletics (track and field)
Athletes (track and field) at the 1952 Summer Olympics
Athletes (track and field) at the 1956 Summer Olympics
Medalists at the 1956 Summer Olympics
Medalists at the 1952 Summer Olympics
European Athletics Championships medalists
Athletes from Berlin